Federico Silvestri (born 22 July 1963) is an Italian swimmer. He competed in the men's 4 × 200 metre freestyle relay at the 1980 Summer Olympics.

References

1963 births
Living people
Italian male swimmers
Olympic swimmers of Italy
Swimmers at the 1980 Summer Olympics
Place of birth missing (living people)
Italian male freestyle swimmers